This page shows the results of the Diving Competition for men and women at the 1991 Pan American Games, held from August 2 to August 18, 1991 in Havana, Cuba. There were three events, for both men and women.

Men's competition

1m Springboard

3m Springboard

10m Platform

Women's competition

1m Springboard

3m Springboard

10m Platform

Medal table

See also
 Diving at the 1992 Summer Olympics

References
 Sports 123
 Flipnrip.com diving website

Events at the 1991 Pan American Games
1991
1991 in diving